Gran Hermano VIP 6 was the sixth season of the reality television Gran Hermano VIP series. The season was launched on 13 September 2018 on Telecinco. Jorge Javier Vazquez became the new host of the show, continuing his job as host of the last two Civilian seasons. Sandra Barneda has been confirmed to be back as the host of the weekly Debate. The motto of this season is "Who will dare?"

Housemates 
The first official housemate of the season, Mónica Hoyos, was announced on August 25 in the TV show Sábado Deluxe. The rest of the housemates were confirmed in later days. In the premiere day, it was announced that some contestants would face people from their past. Oriana would have to live with her ex-boyfriend Tony Spina and Isa Pantoja would have to live with Techi, who she shares an ex-boyfriend with. Also, it was announced that Miriam Saavedra, Mónica's arch-enemy, would enter the house as a housemate on Day 4 at the Debate. On Day 3, Oriana decided to leave the house. On Day 15, Omar Montes, Isa Pantoja's boyfriend, entered the house as a new housemate.

Nominations table

Notes 
 This housemate was the Head of Household.
 This housemate was directly nominated for eviction prior to the regular nominations process.
  This housemate was granted immunity from nominations.

 : The public could have the chance via Twitter to give a housemate the power of 3 extra points in the nominations. Verdeliss won the right.
 : Verdeliss couldn't participate in the HoH competition due to her pregnancy. In order for her to have a chance at the HoH, she had to guess the winning couple. She chose Darek and Makoke. Because she guessed correctly, she was crowned HoH too.
 : As a new housemate, Omar was exempt from nominations.
 : The HoH won the power to save one of the nominees and replace him/her with another housemate.
 : Due to some unfortunate comments, the public was given the chance to decide if Omar should get a direct nomination, by a vote in the app. The audience decided with the 83.7% of the votes that Omar should be nominated.
 : The HoH won the power to veto a housemate's nominations. They chose Miriam.
 : On this round, the nominations were different. Each housemate had to pick a ball which had a different way of nominating. Tony won HoH and could automatically nominate a housemate, he chose Koala. Asraf picked a ball that didn't let him nominate. Mónica picked a ball which let her nominate a housemate with 6 points. The rest of balls were ordinary nominations with 3, 2 and 1 point.
 : Because of the weekly task, Miriam won 1 extra point in nominations.
 : Lines were opened to vote for the winner. The housemate with fewest votes would be evicted.
 : Lines were opened to vote for the winner.

Nominations total received

Debate: Blind results

Ratings

"Galas"

"Debates"

"Límite 48H"

References

External links 
 Official site on Telecinco.es
 Gran Hermano Main Site
 Gran Hermano VIP 24 Hours

Gran Hermano (Spanish TV series) seasons
Telecinco original programming
2018 Spanish television seasons